The Coast Meridian Overpass is a four-lane cable stayed bridge in Port Coquitlam, British Columbia, crossing the Canadian Pacific railyard. The new bridge has a width of 25 metres and a length of 580 m. The bridge has a bike lane on the northbound side and a separated pedestrian walkway on the southbound side of the overpass. The construction project, officially launched in 2008, links Coast Meridian Road and Lougheed Highway on the north with Kingsway Avenue and Broadway Street on the south. The speed limit on the bridge is 50 km/h.

Construction
The bridge opened on March 7, 2010, and has a fixed total construction cost of $132 million (CAD). The construction contractor was SNC-Lavalin.

References

External links 
 Coast Meridian Overpass project website

Bridges in Greater Vancouver
Port Coquitlam
TransLink (British Columbia)
Road bridges in British Columbia